Ratboys are an American indie rock band from Chicago, Illinois, formed in 2010 by Julia Steiner and Dave Sagan. The band consists of Julia Steiner (guitar, vocals), Dave Sagan (guitar), Marcus Nuccio (drums) and Sean Neumann (bass, vocals).

Founded by songwriters Julia Steiner and Dave Sagan during their time studying at Notre Dame in South Bend, Indiana, the band relocated back to Sagan's hometown of Chicago in 2015 and released its debut album AOID that same year on Topshelf Records. Neumann joined the band as full-time member in 2016 and Nuccio joined shortly thereafter in 2017. The band released its second album, GN, in 2017 and began gaining notoriety while touring with other rising acts like PUP, Soccer Mommy, Diet Cig, Wild Pink, and more. Rolling Stone named GN one of the “15 Great Albums You Probably Didn’t Hear in 2017,” while Uproxx rock critic Steven Hyden named the album one of the best albums of the year.

Ratboys released its third studio album, Printer’s Devil, in 2020 to more critical praise. MTV called Printer’s Devil “the best album of their career,” while Pitchfork hailed the album's depth as “comforting and sobering all at once.”

History
Ratboys began in the fall of 2010 when Steiner and Sagan met each other at freshman orientation while studying at Notre Dame in South Bend, Indiana. The pair released their first music together, putting out a cover of “Spiderweb,“ a song originally written by Champaign, Illinois band Easter. Two years later, Ratboys released their first EP titled Ratboy.

In May 2014, Ratboys released two songs, Space Blows and Collected and embarked on their first small tour with future bassist Sean Neumann's band Single Player (later known as Jupiter Styles) that summer in a few cities around the Midwest.

On June 9, 2015, Ratboys released their debut studio album via Topshelf Records titled AOID. The band embarked on their first full United States tours in support of the album, touring the United States and Europe with American bands like Pinegrove, Sorority Noise, Free Throw, Dowsing, and others.

In late 2016, Neumann officially joined the band. Sagan and Neumann knew each other from growing up in Chicago's southern suburbs and have played music together since their teens.

In June 2017, Ratboys released their second full-length album titled GN on Topshelf Records, which began to earn the band widespread media attention from outlets like NPR, Fader, MTV, and others. Rolling Stone named GN one of the “15 Great Albums You Probably Didn’t Hear in 2017,” writing that the “songs are full of shakily proud unburdenings and fun imagination.”

Shortly after the release of GN, the band solidified its lineup by adding drummer Marcus Nuccio after he filled in for the band on drums during Ratboys’ tour with his band Pet Symmetry.

Ratboys toured heavily in support of GN, touring for two years across the United States, Canada, Europe, and Japan. During that time, Ratboys toured with bands such as Soccer Mommy, Pup, Diet Cig, Vundabar, Wild Pink, Slingshot Dakota, Pet Symmetry, and more.

On November 12, 2019, Ratboys announced their third full-length album, Printer's Devil, which was released on February 28, 2020. Along with the announcement, the band released a new song titled "Alien With A Sleep Mask On", as well as a US tour in support of the album.

Steiner and Sagan wrote the bulk of Printer’s Devil while staying in Louisville, Kentucky at Steiner's empty childhood home, which her parents were in the process of selling at the time, which heavily influenced the album's lyricism. The band recorded the album in Chicago, Illinois in the winter of 2018 at Decade Music Studios with producer and engineer Erik Rasmussen. It was also the first time the band's current lineup wrote and recorded new music all together.

Printer’s Devil received critical praise upon its release. Pitchfork gave the album a 7.7 rating and wrote that Steiner's lyrics give “a wistful metaphor for growing up” that fill the listener with “innocuous signifiers of the passage of time that carry weight only in the rare moments we pause to consider them.” MTV said Ratboys made “the best album of their career” and credited the band's newly found “big” sound to be credit to their experience playing in front of larger crowds with bands like PUP, while noting the addition of Neumann and Nuccio, who grew up with extensive backgrounds in Midwestern punk scenes alongside Sagan.

On March 1, 2021, Ratboys released a new single titled "Go Outside" on Topshelf Records, which was then included on their studio album "Happy Birthday, Ratboy" later that year.

Band members
Julia Steiner – vocals / lyrics, guitar
David Sagan – guitar
Sean Neumann – bass, vocals
Marcus Nuccio – drums

Other Live members 
Ian Paine-Jesam – drums
Evan Loritsch – drums
Nnamdi Ogbonnaya - drums
Danny Lyons - drums
Cody Owens - trumpet

Discography
Studio albums
AOID (2015, Topshelf)
GN (2017, Topshelf)
Printer's Devil (2020, Topshelf)
Happy Birthday, Ratboy (2021, Topshelf)

EPs
Ratboy (2011, Swerp)
GL (2018, Topshelf)
GL (8-Bit Version) (2018, Topshelf)

Other songs
Covers Compilation for AFSP (2018, Comp For AFSP) – "I Don't Want To Live On The Moon (Sesame Street)"

References

American emo musical groups
Indie rock musical groups from Illinois
Musical groups from Chicago
Topshelf Records artists
Musical groups established in 2009